Robin Walter Hislop (born 26 February 1992) is a Scottish rugby union player for Saracens in Premiership Rugby. He plays primarily at loose head Prop.

International career 

In June 2021 Hislop was called up to the Scotland squad for the Summer internationals.

References

External links 
 http://www.edinburghrugby.org/edinburgh-rugby/player/robin-hislop

Edinburgh Rugby players
1992 births
Living people
Rugby union props
Rugby union players from Dumfries